The men's team sabre was one of ten fencing events on the fencing at the 2000 Summer Olympics programme. It was the twenty-first appearance of the event. The competition was held on 24 September 2000. 29 fencers from 9 nations competed.

Main tournament bracket
The field of 9 teams competed in a single-elimination tournament to determine the medal winners.  Semifinal losers proceeded to a bronze medal match. Matches were also conducted to determine the final team placements.

Classification 5-8

Classification 9-11

References

External links
 Report of the 2000 Sydney Summer Olympics

Fencing at the 2000 Summer Olympics
Men's events at the 2000 Summer Olympics